is a Japanese women's professional shogi player ranked 1-dan.

Promotion history
Takedomi's promotion history is as follows:

 3-kyū: May 25, 2016
 2-kyū: February 7, 2018
 1-dan: March 9, 2018

Note: All ranks are women's professional ranks.

References

External links
 Japan Shogi Association official profile page 
 ShogiHub: –

Japanese shogi players
Living people
Women's professional shogi players
Professional shogi players from Saga Prefecture
1999 births